Luís Eduardo Magalhães is a municipality in western Bahia, Brazil. The town's main business is agriculture, and it is known as the capital of agribusiness. The city is located in the heart of a rapidly growing agribusiness region and as a result it is the fastest growing city in Brazil. As recently as the 1990s the community was little more than a gas station. It is currently home to Brazil's largest soy processing plant and a big John Deere dealership.

Because all commercial hauling of all commodities to and from the region is done by diesel trucking, there exists high demand for diesel fuel. In 2004, the population of Luís Eduardo Magalhães was 21,454. In 2007, the population was 44,265. The strong population growth was caused by the agribusiness.

The city received many farmers from Southern and Southeastern Brazil, contributing to the economic and cultural development of the city. Luís Eduardo Magalhães has been home to a significant community of young international farmers. The city is also one of the wealthiest agricultural cities in Brazil.
Most of its development was made via channeling of resources from other areas of the region. The creation of this municipality was ruled unconstitutional by Brazil's Supreme Court. It is named after a  deceased member of a powerful oligarchic family, and the city was created solely as a display of power and disdain for the law. The Supreme Court was unable to undo its creation, and simply restated that creating new municipalities in the same fashion is deemed unconstitutional.

Geography

Climate
The climate is Tropical of Altitude. The rainfall pattern is the same as that of the tropical climate. The summer rains are more intense due to the action of the Atlantic tropical mass.

Average temp: 22 °C (71.6 °F).

Rainfall:  700 to 2.000 mm (27.55 to 78,74 in).

Rainy Season: October - April.

Air Humidity: Annual: 70%. December: 80%. August: 50%.

Vegetation
The "Cerrado" landscape is characterized by extensive savanna formations crossed by gallery forests and stream valleys. Cerrado includes various types of vegetation. Humid fields and "buriti" palm paths are found where the water table is near the surface. Alpine pastures occur at higher altitudes and mesophytic forests on more fertile soils. The "cerrado" trees have characteristic twisted trunks covered by a thick bark, and leaves which are usually broad and rigid.

Many herbaceous plants have extensive roots to store water and nutrients. The plant's thick bark and roots serve as adaptations for the periodic fires which sweep the cerrado landscape. The adaptations protect the plants from destruction and make them capable of sprouting again after the fire.

Economy
The economy of Luís Eduardo Magalhães is focused on agribusiness. The region is a major producer of cereals (soybeans and corn), coffee, cotton, as well as cattle raising. Irrigation, the level terrain, and the dry climate with well-defined dry and rainy seasons have made Luis Eduardo Magalhaes a leader in agriculture. Farmers and large agricultural companies from all over the world are purchasing large tracts of the region's fertile flat land. Individuals and companies from the USA, Canada, China, Argentina, India, United Kingdom, New Zealand, Netherlands, Germany and Ireland are making substantial investments in the region.

The GDP for the city was R$1,003,460,120 (2005).

The per capita income for the city was R$22,669 (2005).

Education
Portuguese language is the official national language, and thus the primary language taught in schools.

But English and Spanish are part of the official high school curriculum.

Educational institutions
 Faculdade Arnaldo Horácio Ferreira (FAAHF);
 Faculdade Luiz Eduardo Magalhães (FILEM);
 Instituto de Educação Superior Unyahna Luis Eduardo Magalhães (IESULEM).

International Farmers in L.E.M.
In few years, the region of Luís Eduardo Magalhães has become home to a new community of International farmers. Though some locals have complained about foreigners bidding up land prices, the overseas investors seem to be very welcome. "Absolutely" is how LEM's former mayor, Oziel Oliveira, responded to the question. "They're turning into Brazilians."

Distances

  from Barreiras;
  from Salvador;
  from Brasília;
  from São Paulo.

Notes

References 																

Municipalities in Bahia